Richard Long (died 1986) was an American sound designer. He is known as the preeminent sound designer of the disco era, having installed systems at clubs including Paradise Garage, Dorian Gray, Studio 54, and Max's Kansas City.

Career 
Richard Long initially worked for Alex Rosner, famous for his system installed at the Loft. Long's first nightclub was SoHo Place. In 1977, he designed the custom sound system for Paradise Garage. This system became his flagship. Long was known for his heavy bass sound. Paradise Garage had a custom speaker, the "Levan Horn", designed to increase bass in the club, and named after DJ Larry Levan.

Over the course of his career, Long installed more than 300 systems. Locations included Copacabana, Directoire, the Ginza, the Limelight, Max's Kansas City, Studio 54, Area, Bonds International Casino, Zanzibar (Newark), The Box (Chicago), Ware House, and Paradise Garage. In 1980, Long won the Billboard award for Best Disco Sound Design.

Long died of AIDS in 1986. The only surviving Richard Long soundsystem is at the Eldorado Bumper Car ride in Coney Island, NY. Long was invited to install the system by the Eldorado's owner, Scott Fitlin.

References 

1986 deaths
Deaths from AIDS-related illness
American audio engineers